The École nationale des travaux publics de l'État or ENTPE (English: National School of Public Works of the State) is an engineering school part of the French Grandes Écoles founded in 1954 in Paris by the Ministry of Public Works and Transport and located since 1976 in Lyon Metropolitan Area (Vaulx-en-Velin). The main vocation of ENTPE is to train engineers who will serve as technical managers within the French civil service into the State Public Works Engineering Corps or "Ingénieurs des Travaux Publics de l'Etat (ITPE)", even though nowadays half of the students are intended for the private sector, in particular in large French companies in the construction or transport sectors (Eiffage, Bouygues, Vinci, Keolis ...).

Admission

Recruitment 

 External exams for three quarters of the students. Admission to the ENTPE is made through a nationwide very selective entrance examination, and requires a minimum of two years of preparation after high school in Scientific Preparatory Classes (a two-year highly selective undergraduate program in Mathematics, Physics, Chemistry and Engineering). The ENTPE recruits on average among the top 15% of the students in these preparatory classes. About 180 students per year are recruited in this way; half of them have the status of civil servants. 

 Also exists an exam exclusively made for civil servants having served a minimum of four years, generally technicians wishing to evolve in their careers. Each year, 10 to 15 civil servants are selected by this way
 Recruitment after another degree, a direct admission in second year (Master I equivalent) is possible, for French students or students with citizenship from the European union. It is necessary to already withhold a Master I diploma cum laude in Civil Engineering, Mathematics, Mechanics or Physics. Only a dozen students are selected each year.
 Foreign students (outside EU) have access through the "classical" external way (they can't be French civil servant though) or can access with special conditions through agreements with foreign schools or by a commission deciding on academic files. Foreign students are generally Moroccans, Vietnamese, Chinese, Brazilian or Syrians.

Student Status 
Students can be civil servants or not:
 The civil servants engineering students are paid starting on their first year of school but they sign an engagement to work for the French State for 8 years starting at the end of their scholarship. The netto salary of one of these is around from €1300 to €1500  for the students accepted through the external exam.
 The non-civil servants engineering students are simply called "civilians". They don't get paid during school and work mainly for the private sector once graduated.

Curriculum

Initial Curriculum
The ENTPE trains engineers in 3 years in all the fields of civil engineering, town and country planning and sustainable development. The teaching is the same, regardless of the admission way.

The training goes the following way :

The ENTPE also proposes a large panel of complementary courses, mainly enabling students to obtain a second degree. It is for instance possible for students to obtain degrees from the following schools:

 "Double" curriculum as engineer & architect with an architecture degree from the École nationale supérieure d'architecture de Lyon, common course with students from the INSA de Lyon and the école Centrale de Lyon
"Double" curriculum as engineer & geologist with an engineering diploma in geology from the École nationale supérieure de géologie of Nancy
"Double" curriculum as engineer & manager with a partnership with the Institut d'Administration des Entreprises of Lyon
"Double" curriculum in the field of political sciences with the Institut d'études politiques de Lyon

Doctoral school
The ENTPE is also entitled to deliver PhDs inside one of the 6 laboratories it shelters. Up to 20 PhDs are delivered each year.

Partnerships

French partnerships

The School is member of the following:

 Ministry of Ecology, Energy, Sustainable Development and Sea
 Conférence des grandes écoles
 PRES Université de Lyon: Pôle de recherche et d'enseignement supérieur

International partnerships

The School also enables students to attend classes and obtain degrees from foreign universities, through many partnerships:

 New York University – United States (Master of Science – 9 months)
 University College Cork – Ireland (Master of Engineering – Environment – 18 months)
 University of Westminster in London – UK (Master of Science – 12 months)
 University of Manchester Institute of Science and Technology (UMIST) in Manchester – UK (Master of Science – 12 months)
 Université de Sherbrooke – Canada (Maîtrise – 18 months)
 Université Laval de Québec – Canada (Maîtrise – 18 months)
 École Hassania des Travaux Publics (EHTP) – Royaume du Maroc
 Université autonome de Madrid – Espagne
 Institut universitaire d'architecture de Venise – Italy
 University of California Berkeley – United States (Master of Science and Mechanical Engineering)

Research

Along with teaching, the ENTPE also deploys a strong activity in research. There are actually 6 different laboratories in the school, each one specialized in one of the fields of study evoked before. It has over 200 staff. 4 of its 6 laboratories are part of the CNRS.

Openings
As its name goes, the School trains in the fields of civil engineering ("Travaux Publics"), but also those mentioned before: Building, City Planning, Environment, Transportation, and to sum it up, all the fields of engineering linked to sustainable development.

Non-civil servant students ("civilians")
After School, they are mainly hired by large civil engineering firms such as Egis, Eiffage, Vinci, Arcadis, Bouygues...

Civil servants
There are different possibilities:
 They can keep on obtaining a PhD either at one of the laboratories of the School, or one of the research labs of the Ministry.
 They can be selected by a jury to obtain another degree, through a "fourth year", which will either be another Master II equivalent, or a Mastère Spécialisé in an other French "Grandes Ecoles" (usually ENAC, ENPC, ENSAM ...) or abroad (Imperial College London, University of Nottingham, ...). This mainly concerns the technical areas where the employing ministry needs specific expertise as the civil aviation or the maritime safety.
 Those attending a double diploma as engineer & architect have to attend architecture school for another 2 years minimum
 Finally, most students take up directly their first position as technical management staff in the civil service. For instance as Real Estate project manager, Natural and technological risks specialist, Research Officer in the field of Transport ....
 Still, it is possible for civil servants to go work for a private company, but then they will have to break the contract they have signed with the State, and therefore will have to refund all the money involved by the State in their scholarship (pays and tuitions fees), which sums up to around €90000. These amounts are usually paid by the private company.

Student life

Life on Campus
It was established in Vaulx-en-Velin on a common campus with the school of architecture of Lyon. Numerous sports infrastructures exist, among which can be mentioned a 25 meters and 4 meters deep swimming pool, a dojo, a fitness room, 4 tennis courts. There is naturally also a cafeteria, a students' bar (Grimbergen, 1664) with its patio, a music room.

Thanks to an agreement with the local HLM office, students are housed in cheap and comfortable apartments near the school.

Community life
Like many other schools, the ENTPE focuses a lot on community life through different sport activities:
indoor sports: volley, basketball, indoor-football, badminton, etc.
outdoor sports : football, rugby, sailing, rowing, golf, etc.
water sports : diving, water polo, etc.
mountain sports : hiking, skiing, etc.
dance, fitness.
etc.

But also :
 Music
 Annual School Gala preparation
 The Rencontre Théatrales de Lyon (Reuteuleu), an international festival of student theater 
 Oenology
 Cheese sampling
 Poker
 etc.

Former Students 

 Jean Mallot
 Emmanuel de Buretel
 Yannick Bestaven
 Patrick Jaillet

See also

Other Civil Engineering Schools 
 École spéciale des travaux publics
 École des ingénieurs de la ville de Paris
 Institut national des sciences appliquées de Lyon
 École nationale des ponts et chaussées
 Centre des études supérieures industrielles

References

External links
 The official website
 Forum about the school
 Official website for the students association (Bureau des élèves)
 Alumni website
 Architecture School of Lyon

Universities and colleges in Lyon
Engineering universities and colleges in France
University of Lyon
Grandes écoles